Norrforsen are rapids in the Ume River, between the towns of Norrfors and Sörfors 15 kilometers west of Umeå. The place has several rockcarvings. It was discovered when the penstock was lifted the first time.

References

Geography of Sweden